Obliqui may refer to: 
 Abdominal internal oblique muscle
 Abdominal external oblique muscle